Andre Agassi defeated Todd Martin in the final, 6–4, 6–7(5–7), 6–7(2–7), 6–3, 6–2 to win the men's singles tennis title at the 1999 US Open. With the win, he returned to the world No. 1 singles ranking, and helped end Pete Sampras' streak of six year-end No. 1 rankings.

Patrick Rafter was the two-time defending champion, but lost to Cédric Pioline in the first round after succumbing to shoulder tendinitis.

Seeds

Qualifying draw

Draw

Finals

Top half

Section 1

Section 2

Section 3

Section 4

Bottom half

Section 5

Section 6

Section 7

Section 8

References

External links
 Association of Tennis Professionals (ATP) – 1999 US Open Men's Singles draw
1999 US Open – Men's draws and results at the International Tennis Federation

Men's singlesMen's singles
US Open (tennis) by year – Men's singles